Khayr al-Bayān is a book written by Pir Roshan in 1651. Khair-ul-Bayan is believed to be the first book in Pashto language, beginning Pashto literature. It was written in Pashto, Persian, Arabic, and Urdu, and is considered the first book of Pashto prose. The book was thought to be lost until an original handwritten Persian manuscript was found in the University of Tübingen, Germany. Maulana Abdul Qadir of Pashto Academy - University of Peshawar, obtained and translated it and published a Pashto edition in 1987.

References

1651 works
1651 books
Pashto-language literature